is the debut and first studio album by Japanese singer Sayuri Ishikawa (石川さゆり).  The album was released on 25 August 1973 by Nippon Columbia (日本コロムビア).  Of the twelve songs in the album, four are original songs written for Ishikawa.  The other eight songs are covers.

Track listing

Singles
Kakurenbo (かくれんぼ) was originally released as the first single of Ishikawa with Tsugaru no Sato (津軽の里) as its B-side.

Aoi Tsukiyo no Sampo Michi (青い月夜の散歩道) was Ishikawa’s second single with Anato to Watashi no Mura-matsuri (あなたと私の村祭り) as its B-side.

Personnel
The album came with a 60 cm x 30 cm centerfold portrait of Ishikawa.  However, the sleeve does not credit the photographer for the portrait nor for the album’s cover photo.  Even though this album was released in Ishikawa’s debut year 1973, Ishikawa is not credited with the title “Columbia Princess" (コロムビア・プリンセス), the title used by Nippon Columbia to promote the artist in her debut year.

The sleeve credits Columbia Yurikago Kai  (コロムビアゆりかご会 chorus) for track 1, Columbia Studio Orchestra (コロムビア・スタジオ・オーケストラ) for tracks 1, 6, 7 and 12, and the Shin Shitsunai-gaku Kyokai (新室内楽協会) for the other songs.

Notes

See also 
Sayuri Ishikawa discography

1973 debut albums
Sayuri Ishikawa albums